FSSD may refer to:

 Bally Sports San Diego, formerly Fox Sports San Diego (FSSD)
 Framework for Strategic Sustainable Development, see 
 Franklin Special School District